The Rivne Nuclear Power Plant, also called Rovno is a nuclear power plant in Varash, Rivne Oblast, Ukraine.

The Rivne Nuclear Power Station were the first VVER-400 reactors to be constructed in Ukraine. As the plant was being designed and constructed it was under the name of "West-Ukraine NPP" however during commissioning it was renamed to "Rivne NPPP". 

The Regulatory Committee of Ukraine, during a meeting Varash, adopted а decision оn extending the lifetime of Rivne power units 1 and 2 bу 20 years. 

The power station has four reactors with a nameplate capacity of just over 2500 MWe.

In 2018 unit 3, after modernization, received a life-extension license extending its operation by 20 years until 2037.

See also 

 Nuclear power in Ukraine

External links
 Profile at International Nuclear Safety Program website
 Ukrainian National Atomic Generation Company «Energoatom»

References

Nuclear power stations in Ukraine
Nuclear power stations built in the Soviet Union
Nuclear power stations using pressurized water reactors
Nuclear power stations using VVER reactors
Buildings and structures in Rivne Oblast
Energoatom